Elections to the 51st Parliament of New South Wales were held on Saturday 25 March 1995. All seats in the Legislative Assembly and half the seats in the Legislative Council were up for election. The minority Liberal Party-led Coalition government of Premier John Fahey was defeated by the Labor Party, led by Opposition Leader Bob Carr. Carr went on to become the longest continuously-serving premier in the state's history, stepping down in 2005. Fahey pursued a brief career as a Federal Government minister.

Background

1991 election
Despite recording 52.7 per cent of the two-party preferred vote in 1991, the Coalition won only 49 of the 99 seats. The Coalition’s best results were in safe Liberal Party seats on Sydney’s North Shore while Labor won the battle in key marginal seats. Four seats that would normally have been held by the Coalition were won by Independents. Both John Hatton in South Coast and Clover Moore in Bligh were re-elected. They were joined by former National Party member Tony Windsor in Tamworth and local councillor Dr Peter Macdonald in Manly. Windsor quickly came to an accommodation with the Government, but the three non-aligned Independents used their position to negotiate a comprehensive memorandum of understanding. Signed in October 1991, it was a document that concentrated more on issues of accountability and process rather than specific policies. Most importantly, the agreement introduced fixed four-year parliamentary terms, a provision entrenched in the Constitution with 76 per cent support at a referendum called in conjunction with the 1995 election.

The Coalition's second term
Having signed the agreement with the Independents, the Government found its position further eroded in October 1991 when Metherell resigned from the Liberal Party without warning in a live television interview. In December, the Court of Disputed Returns overturned the Government’s victory in The Entrance. Labor won the subsequent by-election in January 1992.

What was to follow brought an end to the political careers of Premier Greiner and Environment Minister Tim Moore. A public service job was found for the by now disenchanted Metherell. The Government was virtually certain to win his seat of Davidson at a by-election (which it subsequently did). However, Greiner and Moore found themselves before an Independent Commission Against Corruption (ICAC) investigation into the matter, with the inquiry making a finding of corrupt conduct against both. The independents who had been keeping the Coalition in office for the last year told Greiner that unless he resigned, they would withdraw their support from the Coalition and support a Labor no-confidence motion. Facing almost certain defeat in the House, Greiner resigned, and Industrial Relations Minister John Fahey became the new Premier. The ICAC decision was later overturned in the courts, but by then Greiner and Moore had already resigned from Parliament.

A solicitor and former footballer, Fahey’s folksy style was very different from the aloof and precise Greiner, and a significant challenge to bookish Labor leader Bob Carr. Fahey established a strong public image, helped by his highly publicised victory leap when Sydney won the right to host the 2000 Olympics, and later when he crash-tackled an intruder who lunged at Prince Charles during a royal visit. As the economy improved, the Coalition slowly began to establish a lead in opinion polls.

Fahey’s major problem was an accident prone Ministry and backbench. Several members in marginal seats attracted unwanted inquiries. Blue Mountains MP Barry Morris was disendorsed when he was revealed as the source of bomb threats against a local newspaper. Police Minister Terry Griffiths was forced to resign over sexual harassment allegations. Labor backed Independent John Hatton’s long called for royal commission into the police, seeing it as another opportunity to embarrass the Government.

The Government’s difficulty in handling these issues was due to the increased accountability created by its minority position in the Legislative Assembly. The agreement with the non-aligned Independents did not prevent the Government from bringing forward and passing controversial legislation. However, the Government was required to fully debate legislation, to hold unwanted inquiries and to table documents on request. All this prevented the Government from controlling the agenda of day to day politics.

Not that Labor went into the 1995 election certain of victory, Labor was tainted by the growing unpopularity of the Keating Government in Canberra. The opening of the third runway at Sydney Airport in late 1994 created confusion for the Labor Party as the issue threatened the Party’s hold on several inner-city seats.

To place a distance with his federal colleagues Carr branded his team as "State Labor" throughout the campaign.

Two referendums were held in conjunction with the election, both of which were approved by the voters. The first concerned the independence of judges. The second, and far more important historically, was the approval of fixed four-year terms to prevent early elections, passed with 76% voting 'yes'.

Key dates

Results

Legislative Assembly

{{Australian elections/Title row
| table style = float:right;clear:right;margin-left:1em;
| title        = New South Wales state election, 25 March 1995
| house        = Legislative Assembly
| series       = New South Wales state election
| back         = 1991
| forward      = 1999
| enrolled     = 3,837,102
| total_votes  = 3,599,141
| turnout %    = 93.80%
| turnout chg  = +0.18%
| informal     = 185,379
| informal %   = 5.15%
| informal chg = -4.17%
}}

|}

{{bar box|float=right|title=Popular vote|titlebar=#ddd|width=600px|barwidth=410px|bars=

}}Labor easily won Blue Mountains (Liberal chances were ruined when the former Liberal member, Barry Morris, ran as an Independent), and narrowly won Badgery's Creek by 107 votes and Gladesville by 260 votes, giving Labor a one-seat majority. The Liberal Party gained South Coast on the retirement of Independent John Hatton, but was unable to dislodge either Peter Macdonald in Manly or Clover Moore in Bligh. Tony Windsor was re-elected without opposition from the National Party in Tamworth.

Despite winning only 48.8% of the two-party-preferred vote for the Legislative Assembly, Labor won a majority of seats. There was speculation that the introduction of one-vote one-value boundaries had disadvantaged the Coalition by locking up too many votes in its safe seats. The discrepancy since 1981 between the state-wide vote and the swing required in marginal seats certainly supported that view. An alternative argument was that the Labor Party had proved itself superior at choosing local candidates and running strong local campaigns. Whatever the cause, the Coalition’s dogged marginal seat campaign in 1995 had come perilously close to denying Labor victory. The irony was that had the Coalition run such a campaign in 1991, the Greiner Government would probably have been re-elected with a narrow majority, and the political turmoil of the previous four years would have been avoided.

The Liberal Party seemed set to challenge the results in seats narrowly won by the ALP in the Court of Disputed Returns, but that idea was dropped on the instructions of the new Liberal leader Peter Collins.

Legislative Council 
Single transferable voting used to elect the 21 members up for election this year. This was an unusually large number of members to be elected through STV.

{{Australian elections/Title row
| table style = float:right;clear:right;margin-left:1em;
| title        = New South Wales state election, 25 March 1995
| house        = Legislative Council
| series       = New South Wales state election
| back         = 1991
| forward      = 1999
| staggered    = yes
| enrolled     = 3,837,102
| total_votes  = 3,599,139
| turnout %    = 93.80
| turnout chg  = +0.22
| informal     = 219,960
| informal %   = 6.11
| informal chg = –0.31
}}

	

|}

Seats changing hands

 Members listed in italics did not recontest their seats.
 The member for Blue Mountains, Barry Morris was elected as a Liberal at the 1991 election, but resigned from the party. He recontested this seat as an Independent. The pre-election margin is the Liberal vs. Labor vote.
 In addition, the Labor Party held the district of The Entrance, which it had won from the Liberals at the 1992 by-election.

Post-election pendulum

See also 
 Candidates of the 1995 New South Wales state election

References 

Elections in New South Wales
New South Wales state election
1990s in New South Wales
New South Wales state election